The 1947 Major League Baseball season, was contested from April 15 through October 6, 1947. The American League and National League both featured eight teams, with each team playing a 154-game schedule. The World Series was contested between the New York Yankees against the Brooklyn Dodgers, with the Yankees winning in seven games, capturing the 11th championship in franchise history.

On April 15, Opening Day for the National League's Brooklyn Dodgers, Jackie Robinson was in the Dodgers' lineup, playing first base against the Boston Braves at Ebbets Field. His appearance in a major league game broke the baseball color line, the practice of excluding players of black African descent. Later in the season, Larry Doby debuted with the Cleveland Indians on July 5, becoming the first black player in the American League.

Statistical leaders

Standings

American League

National League

Postseason

Bracket

Awards and honors

Baseball Hall of Fame: Carl Hubbell; Frankie Frisch; Mickey Cochrane; Lefty Grove
Most Valuable Player: Joe DiMaggio (AL); Bob Elliott (NL)
Rookie of the Year: Jackie Robinson
The Sporting News Player of the Year Award: Ted Williams (AL) – OF, Boston Red Sox
The Sporting News Manager of the Year Award: Bucky Harris (AL) – New York Yankees

Managers

American League

National League

Home Field Attendance

Events

April–June
 April 15 – Major League Baseball's color line is officially broken when Jackie Robinson makes his Major League debut for the Brooklyn Dodgers against the Boston Braves at Ebbets Field.
 April 27 – It is Babe Ruth Day at Yankee Stadium. Despite having throat cancer, he speaks to the packed house, proclaiming, "The only real game, I think, in the world is baseball."
 June 18 – Ewell Blackwell pitches a no-hitter, leading the Cincinnati Reds to a 6–0 win over the Boston Braves.

July–September
 July 5 – Larry Doby makes his debut for the Cleveland Indians, becoming the first black baseball player in the American League, and fully integrating Major League Baseball.
 July 8 – At Wrigley Field, home of the Chicago Cubs, the American League defeats the National League, 2–1, in the All-Star Game.
 July 10 – Cleveland Indians pitcher Don Black throws a no-hitter in a 3–0 win over the Philadelphia Athletics.
 July 19 – Hall of Fame Negro leagues player Willard Brown makes his major league debut with the St. Louis Browns. Brown would only appear in 21 games for St. Louis in his only major league season, batting .179 with one home run and six runs batted in.
 July 20 – With both Hank Thompson and Willard Brown in the starting line-up, the St. Louis Browns become the first major league club to field two black players at the same time. Both players play all nine innings of both games of a doubleheader with the Boston Red Sox.
 August 13 – The St. Louis Browns' Willard Brown clubs a pinch hit a two-run, inside-the-park homer against Detroit Tigers pitcher Hal Newhouser, to become the first African American player to hit a home run in American League history.
 August 20 – Washington Senators relief pitcher Tom Ferrick loses both games of a doubleheader with the Cleveland Indians. While pitching with the St. Louis Browns the previous season, Ferrick won both games of a doubleheader against the Philadelphia Athletics on August 4.
 August 26 – Brooklyn Dodgers' Dan Bankhead became the first black pitcher in the majors. He homered in his first major league plate appearance, but didn't fare well on the mound. In 3 1⁄3 innings of relief, he gave up 10 hits and six earned runs to the Pittsburgh Pirates, who won the game, 16–3.
 September 3 – Bill McCahan of the Philadelphia Athletics no-hits the Washington Senators in a 3–0 victory.

October–December
 October 6 – The New York Yankees defeat the Brooklyn Dodgers, 5–2, in Game 7 of the World Series to win their eleventh World Championship, four games to three. This was the first World Series involving a nonwhite player, as Dodgers first baseman Jackie Robinson had racially integrated Major League Baseball at the beginning of the season. It was also the first Series to be shown on television although coverage was limited to New York City and surrounding environs.
 November 27 – Triple Crown winner Ted Williams (.343 BA, 32 home runs, 114 RBI) is edged out by Joe DiMaggio (.315, 20, 97) for the American League MVP Award by one point. One BBWAA member fails to include Williams anywhere on his ballot.

See also
1947 All-American Girls Professional Baseball League season

References

External links
1947 Major League Baseball season schedule at Baseball Reference

 
Major League Baseball seasons